Amir Ghayeb (also Romanized as Amīr Ghāyeb and Amīr Ghā'eb) is a village in Gavdul-e Sharqi Rural District, in the Central District of Malekan County, East Azerbaijan Province, Iran. At the 2006 census, its population was 357, in 81 families.

References 

Populated places in Malekan County